Rack Marsh is a   nature reserve in Bagnor, on the north-western outskirts of Newbury in Berkshire. It is managed by the Berkshire, Buckinghamshire and Oxfordshire Wildlife Trust. It is part of Kennet and Lambourn Floodplain, which is a Biological Site of Special Scientific Interest, and a Nature Conservation Review site. It is also part of the Kennet and Lambourn Floodplain Special Area of Conservation.

Geography and site

Rack Marsh is an old wet meadow. A thick layer of peat has developed on top of the deposits of alluvium and gravel which the river has spread over the chalk. The river Lambourn flows through the meadow.

History

There is evidence of prehistoric activity in the area: a prehistoric canoe was discovered in the layer of peat by some labourers who were digging a ditch to form a boundary of a garden.

In 1996 the discovery of the rare Desmoulin's whorl snail on the reserve meant that the Newbury bypass was almost stopped, but the high court ruled in the developers' favour. The decision to continue with the construction of the road meant that the nature reserve was cut in size, losing half its area.

Fauna

The site has the following fauna:

Invertebrates

Desmoulin's whorl snail

Birds

Common chiffchaff
Grey heron
Common kingfisher
Eurasian reed warbler
Sedge warbler
Common whitethroat
Barn owl

Flora

The site has the following flora:

Plants

Filipendula ulmaria
Trifolium pratense
Lychnis flos-cuculi
Caltha palustris
Scutellaria galericulata
Geum rivale
Scrophularia auriculata
Myosotis scorpioides
Mentha aquatica
Angelica sylvestris
Triglochin palustris
Dactylorhiza praetermissa
Marsh valerian

References

Parks and open spaces in Berkshire
Nature reserves in Berkshire
Berkshire, Buckinghamshire and Oxfordshire Wildlife Trust